Veliki Radinci is a village in Serbia. It is situated in the Sremska Mitrovica municipality, in the Syrmia District, Vojvodina province. The village has a Serb ethnic majority and its population numbering 1,426 people (2011 census).

Name 

In Serbian, the village is known as Veliki Radinci (Велики Радинци), in Croatian as Veliki Radinci, and in Hungarian as Radinc. Its name derived from Serbian words veliki 'large, big' and raditi 'to work'. The name of the village in Serbian is plural.

Demographics 

1282 adult citizens live in the village. The average age of citizens is 39.1 years (37.8 for men and 40.4 for women). There are 607 households and the average number of members per household is 2.66. The majority of citizens are Serbs.

See also 

 List of places in Serbia
 List of cities, towns and villages in Vojvodina

References 

 Попис у Србији 2011, 13.06.2015.
 Slobodan Ćurčić, Broj stanovnika Vojvodine, Novi Sad, 1996.

Populated places in Syrmia
Sremska Mitrovica